A referendum on holding a Constitutional Convention was held in the Northern Mariana Islands on 5 November 1983. The proposal was approved by voters. A subsequent 44-part referendum on constitutional amendments was held in 1985.

Background
The referendum was held in accordance with Chapter XVIII, article 2 of the Northern Mariana Islands Commonwealth Constitution, which stated that there must be a referendum on calling a Constitutional Convention every ten years.  Voters were asked the question "Shall there be a constitutional convention to propose amendments to the Constitution?"

References

Northern Mariana
1983 in the Northern Mariana Islands
Constitutional referendums in the Northern Mariana Islands
Constitutional convention ballot measures in the United States